Tamar Ramadhan Fattah Kuchar was the governor of Iraq's Dahuk province in Iraqi Kurdistan between 2005 and 2013. He has been actively involved in further developing Dahuk's educational and infrastructure capabilities.

External links
Dahuk Governorate (English)
Kurdistan Democratic Party (KDP)

References
Dahuk ex-governor sentenced 10 years in prison over corruption charges 30 October 2017
Environment Minister participates in the second biological conference in Duhok University 8 May 2008
Duhok Governor Visits Amedi District 28 April 2008
Dohuk Governor Visits UoD 21 April 2008
George Mansour, governor of Dahuk looking for organizations 17 April 2008
Turkish delegation meets Duhok governor 2 April 2008
Constructing Electricity Station in Duhok 30 January 2008
Governor of Dohuk receives Brenko Oil Company representative 26 November 2007
Some Iraqi Kurds find rebel cousins 'annoying' 14 November 2007
The Kurdish Globe New correction center opens in Duhok 4 September 2007
Seminar for Coordination and Mutual Work 16 July 2007
Assyrian Village in North Iraq Terrorized By Kurd 11 April 2007
Duhok’s economy prospers 3 April 2007
Dohuk Governor discusses service-project plans 27 November 2006
Dohuk Governor inspects projects 1 October 2006
Governor of Dohuk visits Cham Barakat water project 15 July 2006
German, Lebanese, and Iranian companies construct projects in Kurdistan 19 March 2006
Kurdish-Swedish Friendship Association active in Duhok 7 February 2006
A Czech plan to build hydroelectric stations in Duhok 2 February 2006
Iraq: Kurds Claim Their Right To Oil 3 December 2005
IDPS IN DAHUK GOVERNORATE
News from Peesh-Khabor

Year of birth missing (living people)
Living people
Political office-holders in Iraq
Governors of Dahuk Governorate
Kurdistan Democratic Party politicians